Mouth to Mouth is the sixth studio album by Australian pop rock band Mental As Anything, released in July 1987, and the album was produced by Richard Gottehrer. The album peaked at number 14 on the Australian chart.

Track listing

Personnel

Musicians
 Martin Plaza — lead vocals, guitar    
 Greedy Smith — lead vocals, keyboards, harmonica
 Reg Mombassa — guitar, vocals  
 Peter O'Doherty — bass, guitar, vocals 
 Wayne de Lisle – drums

Additional personnel
 Martin Armiger — guitar
 Mary Bradfield-Taylor — vocals
 Rick Chadwick — keyboards
 Sandi Chick — vocals 
 Andrew Farriss — keyboards 
 Mark Kennedy — percussion

Recording details
 Producer — Richard Gottehrer
 Engineer, mixing — Thom Panunzio
 Assistant — Allan Wright

Art work
 Art direction — Jana Hartig, Ken Smith, Sue Woollard
 Design — Martin Plaza, Greedy Smith (and cover design)
 Photography — Paula Clarke (cover photo), Paul Clarke, Hugh Hamilton, Frank Lindner (and sleeve photo), Francine McDougall

Charts

Release history

References 

1987 albums
Mental As Anything albums
Albums produced by Richard Gottehrer
CBS Records albums
Festival Records albums
Epic Records albums
Columbia Records albums